Cleopatra Zvezdana Nikolic (born 24 March 1991), better known by her stage name Cleo Sol, is a British singer-songwriter. Working closely with the producer Inflo, she has released two solo studio albums, Rose in the Dark (2020) and Mother (2021), and is a rumoured member of the R&B collective Sault.

Early life
Cleo Sol was born and raised in Ladbroke Grove. Her mother is Serbian-Spanish and her father is Jamaican. Both are musicians.

Music career
Cleo Sol made her debut in 2008 featuring on the single "Tears" by Tinie Tempah. In 2011 Cleo Sol signed to DaVinChe's record label Dirty Canvas and Island Records, releasing singles such as "High" and "Never the Right Time (Who Do You Love)".

She took a musical hiatus from 2012 to 2017. She returned with the EP Winter Songs, released on 9 March 2018.

In 2019, Cleo Sol was featured on the single "Selfish" by British rapper Little Simz, reconnecting in 2021 with the rapper for the song "Woman".

She released her debut studio album, Rose in the Dark, on 27 March 2020, included by Complex and Clash in their end-of-year lists. The following year, Nikolic released her second studio album, titled Mother, on 20 August 2021.

She is rumoured to be a member of the pseudonymous collective SAULT who have released eleven studio albums.

Musical style
Cleo Sol has cited influences from Stevie Wonder, Erykah Badu and Jill Scott while growing up on genres such as reggae, Motown and Latin music.

Discography

Studio albums

Extended plays

Singles

As featured artist

Guest appearances

Awards and nominations

References

1991 births
Living people
English women singers
21st-century Black British women singers
British contemporary R&B singers
Singers from London
People from Ladbroke Grove
English people of Serbian descent
English people of Spanish descent
English people of Jamaican descent